A. Rajan is an Indian politician and a Ex.Member of the Legislative Assembly. He was elected to the Tamil Nadu legislative assembly as a Dravida Munnetra Kazhagam candidate from Nagercoil constituency in Kanyakumari district in 2006 election.

References 

Dravida Munnetra Kazhagam politicians
Living people
Year of birth missing (living people)